Mr. Coffee is a registered trademark of Newell Brands. The Mr. Coffee brand manufactures automatic-drip kitchen coffee machines, as well as other products. The brand was founded in the early 1970s. Mr. Coffee has often been referenced in popular culture and has been promoted by celebrities such as Joe DiMaggio and Dave Kovack.

History

Vincent Marotta and Samuel Glazer founded a company in Cleveland, Ohio focused on coffee delivery called North American Systems (NAS) in the early 1970s. At this time, Marotta had an idea to create an automatic drip coffeemaker. Marotta and Glazer hired two former Westinghouse engineers, Edmund Abel and Edwin Schulze, to engineer the idea.  In 1972, the Mr. Coffee brand drip coffeemaker was made available for home use. Prior to this machine, coffee was primarily made in a percolator, which often gave it a bitter and burned flavor. The new Mr. Coffee machine produced a much more uniform brewing temperature which resulted in a predictable flavor. Unlike later models, this original offering, with its distinctive yellow and white gingham decal, used gravity to immediately pull water through a heating section and allowed to drip freely into carafe below. Later units used thermosyphons (similar to the principle operating geysers) to carry water up from a reservoir as it reached boiling point in the lift tube. It was identical to the percolator principle but without the endless recirculation and reheating of the coffee.

In 1973, Marotta convinced former professional baseball player Joe DiMaggio to become an advertising spokesman for the brand. This coffee maker sold more than one million units by April 1974.

A succession of products from 1992 to 1995 — the Potato Perfect, the Mr. Coffee Juicer, Food Dehydrator by Mr. Coffee, Bread maker by Mr. Coffee, and Mrs. Tea Hot Tea Maker — contributed about one-third of Mr. Coffee's total annual sales of $174 million by 1995.  The device variation for tea called Mrs. Tea differed from the Mr. Coffee branded appliance only in detail as the company claims the drip process works equally well for tea as for coffee, although the result is often a darker, samovar type of tea.

In the 1980s, Mr. Coffee endured a leveraged buyout and two significant changes in ownership before being acquired by Health O Meter Products, Inc. (eventually known as Signature Brands USA) in 1994. In 1998 Sunbeam Corporation (eventually known as American Household, Inc.) purchased Signature Brands. In January 2005, Jarden acquired American Household, Inc.

Since 2009 

Recently, the Mr. Coffee product development team altered how their drip coffee maker works with a method dubbed "Optimal Brew." The coffee maker does not use the previously mentioned traditional method of routing the water over a heating coil under the warming plate. Instead, a small flash boiling chamber flash heats the water to deliver the water to the beans within a temperature range of 195–200 °F.  Heating the water this way allows 10 cups to be brewed in generally less than eight minutes, depending on the barometric pressure.  Once brewed the coffee stays warm in a thermal carafe without requiring a heating plate which could potentially burn the coffee.

2012 recall
In 2012, more than 600,000 Mr. Coffee Single Cup Brewing System models were voluntarily recalled in the United States and Canada. A malfunction caused the machines to build up steam and potentially spew water and grounds out of the brewing chamber. There was a 164 reports of the malfunction made, among which there were 61 injuries including facial and hand burns.

Popular culture
The Mr. Coffee name is mentioned in The Bloodhound Gang's song "The Bad Touch", in the full version of the Cheers theme song, the Marah song "Christian St." and in the title of Raymond Carver's short story "Mr. Coffee and Mr. Fixit." Mr. Coffee is mentioned in the American TV sitcom Seinfeld In Hoyle Card Games 2011, Rhett said "That's worse than Mr. Coffee".

A Mr. Coffee branded appliance appears in a scene in the 1995 feature film Apollo 13; a number of critics pointed out that this was inaccurate as the film's story occurred in 1970 and the Mr. Coffee appliance was not introduced until 1972. It also featured in a nostalgic discussion between the two main characters of the 2017 novel Entertaining Welsey Shaw.

There have been several parodies in popular media, such as in the Back to the Future trilogy as Mr. Fusion (which was actually made for the movie from a Krups coffee grinder), and in Spaceballs as Mr. Radar, Mr. Rental, and Mr. Coffee itself. In the Futurama movie The Beast with a Billion Backs, one character can be seen using a Mr. Wino machine to make wine directly from grapes.

References

Further reading

External links
 Official website
 NPR Story on Mr. Coffee and Joe DiMaggio
 Encyclopedia of Cleveland History, Case Western Reserve University

Coffee appliance vendors
Cooking appliance brands
Home appliance brands
American brands
Products introduced in 1972
Newell Brands
1994 mergers and acquisitions
1998 mergers and acquisitions
2005 mergers and acquisitions
2016 mergers and acquisitions